Gandhigram is a census town in Dindigul district along the National Highway 44 in the state of Tamil Nadu, India.

Demographics
 India census, Gandhigram had a population of 10,666. Males constitute 53% of the population and females 47%. Gandhigram has an average literacy rate of 74%, higher than the national average of 59.5%: male literacy is 79%, and female literacy is 69%. In Gandhigram, 11% of the population is under 6 years of age.

Gandhigram Rural Institute 
Gandhigram Rural Institute is 100% funded by the Government of India through University Grants Commission, New Delhi. It is not managed by the Gandhigram Trust. This university is a deemed university and delivers diploma, undergraduate, post-graduate programs, M.Phil. and Ph.D. in various disciplines of Science, Social Science, Agriculture, Public health, Rural Industries.

Kasthuriba Hospital
Gandhigram Trust also operates a hospital in the name of Mahatma Gandhi's wife Kasthuribai. This hospital is one of the largest hospital in the district. But unlike other private hospital, this hospital is service centric. Here many poor people from surrounding villages get quality care and treatment with well established infra-structure. At present Dr. Kousalya Devi is governing the hospital. She is well known for her service as Mother Teresa of Tamil Nadu. In this hospital they manufacture jaipur foot.

References

Villages in Dindigul district